Illinois Vietnam Veterans Memorial honors the 2,970 Illinois residents who are listed as killed or listed as missing in action during the Vietnam War.  Dedicated in 1988, the Memorial includes the names of the dead or missing carved in black granite walls that radiate from the central eternal flame.  Supporting the flame are five vertical gray granite walls, each representing a branch of the armed services.  A vigil and memorial service is held each year on the first full weekend in May and on Memorial Day, as well as the first Saturday in December.

The Memorial is maintained by the Illinois Historic Preservation Agency as a state historic site, and is located at Oak Ridge Cemetery in Springfield, Illinois.

References

External links
 Illinois Vietnam Veterans Memorial

Eternal flames
Illinois State Historic Sites
Monuments and memorials in Illinois
Tourist attractions in Springfield, Illinois
Buildings and structures in Springfield, Illinois
1988 sculptures
1988 establishments in Illinois
Granite sculptures in Illinois
Outdoor sculptures in Illinois